The North American O-47 is an American observation fixed-wing aircraft monoplane designed in the mid-1930s and used by the United States Army Air Corps during the Second World War. It has a low-wing configuration, retractable landing gear, and a three-blade propeller.

Design and development

The O-47 was developed as a replacement for the Thomas-Morse O-19 and Douglas O-38 observation biplanes. It was larger and heavier than most preceding observation aircraft and its crew of three sat in tandem under the long canopy. Windows in the deep belly overcame the obstacle that the wings presented to downward observation and photography. The design for the XO-47 prototype originated in 1934 with General Aviation Manufacturing, a subsidiary of North American Aviation, as the GA-15. The Air Corps ordered 174 O-47s in 1937 to 1938, 93 of which were assigned to National Guard units. In 1938, the Army ordered 74 O-47Bs with a redesigned engine cowling for better cooling, an uprated engine, and improved radio equipment.

Operational history
Training maneuvers in 1941 demonstrated the shortcomings of the O-47. Single-engined light airplanes like the Piper L-4 and Stinson L-5 proved more capable of operating with ground troops, while fighters and twin engine bombers showed greater ability to perform recon and photo duties. Thus, O-47s during World War II, except for those caught at overseas bases by the Japanese attacks, were relegated to secondary duties such as towing targets, coastal patrol, and anti-submarine patrol.

Variants
XO-47 one built, serial number 36-145 in Dundalk, Maryland, 850 hp (634 kW) Wright R-1820-41 engine
O-47A 164 built in Inglewood California, Wright R-1820-49 engine
O-47B 74 built, minor improvements and a 1,060 hp (790 kW) Wright R-1820-57 engine installed, plus an extra 50 gallon fuel tank

Operators

 United States Army Air Corps

Surviving aircraft

 37-279 – O-47A in storage at the Paul E. Garber Preservation, Restoration, and Storage Facility of the National Air and Space Museum in Suitland, Maryland.
 39-098 – O-47B owned by James P. Harker of Blaine, Minnesota. It was previously placed on loan to the Combat Air Museum in Topeka, Kansas by its owner William A. Dempsay, but was sold as of June 2014.
 39-112 – O-47B on static display at the National Museum of the United States Air Force in Dayton, Ohio. It is displayed in the markings of an O-47A belonging to the 112th Observation Squadron of the Ohio National Guard. It was acquired in 1978 from Loren L. Florey Jr., of Eden Prairie, Minnesota and was restored by the 179th Consolidated Aircraft Maintenance Squadron, Ohio Air National Guard, Mansfield, Ohio.
 Composite – O-47A under restoration at the Planes of Fame Air Museum in Chino, California. It is made up of serial numbers 38-284 and 38-295.

Specifications (O-47A)

See also

References
Notes

Citations

Bibliography

 Eden, Paul and Soph Moeng. The Complete Encyclopedia of World Aircraft. London: Amber Books Ltd., 2002. .
 Fahey, James C. U.S. Army Aircraft 1908-1946. New York: Ships and Aircraft, 1946.
 Swanborough, F.G. and Peter M. Bowers. United States Military Aircraft Since 1909. New York: Putnam New York, 1964. .

External links

 Boeing: O-47 - Official site 

O-47, North American
O-47
Single-engined tractor aircraft
Low-wing aircraft
Aircraft first flown in 1935